William Charles McNulty (1884–1963) was an American artist, who created realistic etchings and drawings of New York. He was born in Ogden, Utah. He studied art in 1908 and 1909 at the Art Students League in New York, where he also later taught. He was a successful editorial cartoonist for the Seattle Star.  Works by McNulty are housed in the permanent collections of the Metropolitan Museum of Art, the New York Public Library, the Newark, Detroit and Whitney Museums, the U.S. Library of Congress and the University of Nebraska.

McNulty started as a newspaper artist in Nebraska and Montana, but wasn't content to stay there. In New York, he studied at the league between 1907 and 1909. After returning to the journalism field, going to New Orleans and Seattle, he took up printmaking under the encouragement of Joseph Pennell, founder of the graphic arts department at the Art Students League. He worked in the League and was exhibiting prints by 1927. He had prints included in the first International Exhibition of Etching organized by the Art Institute of Chicago in 1932, and the institute continued to display his work until 1946.

In 1931, he began teach at the Art Students League. His work was part of the painting event in the art competition at the 1932 Summer Olympics. He taught until 1958. He died of a heart ailment in Addison Gilbert Hospital in Gloucester, MA, at the age of seventy-nine on September 26, 1963.

Editorial cartoonist VON-A
McNulty had worked for newspapers around in Nebraska and Montana and in New Orleans and Seattle as an editorial cartoonist. Under the name Von-A he worked for the Seattle Star, and had illustrations printed in The Cartoon: A Reference Book of Seattle's Successful Men and the 12th Session of the Washington State Legislature. Both were vanity cartoon books, collaborations of Seattle area cartoonists from its big three newspapers, featuring the rich and powerful in caricature and newsroom editorial-style drawing. The two books represent work he did as a member of the Seattle Cartoonists' Club in 1911.

See also

Editorial illustrations
The Cartoon; A Reference Book of Seattle's Successful Men, Frank Calvert (ed.), Metropolitan Press, Seattle, 1911. Online text
12th Session of the Washington State Legislature by Alfred T. Renfro, with illustrations by W. C. McNulty (Von-A), W. C. Morris, and Frank Calvert. Three of the cartoonists again included sketches of themselves. Online text

Art
Etchings.
Smithsonian has one of his sketchbooks
Graphite drawing, New York in the Fifties, 1931
1930 Etching, Brooklyn Bridge.
Etching, Fifth Avenue Hotels.
1935 Etching, Fulton Market Docks.
1930 Etching, Men Working on Dock.
1935 Etching, New York From Stevens Institute.
1929 Etching, Woolworth Building New York.

Other
Terra Foundation for American Art: McNulty biography

References

American printmakers
American editorial cartoonists
American caricaturists
American illustrators
American male journalists
Journalists from New York City
Art Students League of New York alumni
Artists from Seattle
Artists from Ogden, Utah
1880s births
1963 deaths
Olympic competitors in art competitions